Shangcheng County is a county of Henan province, China, containing the province's southernmost point and bordering Anhui to the southeast as well as Hubei to the south and southwest. It is under the administration of Xinyang City.

Administrative divisions
As 2012, this county is divided to 8 towns and 11 townships.
Towns

Townships

Climate

References

External links
Official website of Shangcheng County Government

 
County-level divisions of Henan
Xinyang